Resurrection (Italian: Resurrezione) is a 1944 Italian drama film directed by Flavio Calzavara and starring Doris Duranti, Claudio Gora and Germana Paolieri. It is an adaptation of the 1899 work Resurrection, the final novel by the Russian writer Leo Tolstoy. It was one of a significant number of Italian films based on works of Russian literature made during the era. It was made at the Scalera Studios in Rome.

Cast
 Doris Duranti as Caterina Màslova  
 Claudio Gora as Dimitri Neklindoff  
 Germana Paolieri as Alessandra  
 Wanda Capodaglio as Zia Sofia  
 Guido Notari as Scembok  
 Egisto Olivieri as Il commissario  
 Gemma Bolognesi as Matriona  
 Tilde Teldi as Maria Ivanovna  
 Doris Hild as Missy  
 Oreste Fares as Il vecchio domestico di Dimitri 
 Emilio Petacci as Un carceriere 
 Tina Lattanzi as La principessa Korciaghin  
 Augusto Di Giovanni as Il mercante Smielkoff  
 Joop van Hulzen as Il compagno di scherma di Dimitri

References

Bibliography 
 Testa, Carlo. Italian Cinema and Modern European Literatures, 1945-2000. Greenwood Publishing Group, 2002.

External links 
 

1944 films
Italian historical drama films
Italian black-and-white films
1940s historical drama films
1940s Italian-language films
Films directed by Flavio Calzavara
Films set in the 19th century
Films set in Russia
Films based on Resurrection
Films shot at Scalera Studios
1940s Italian films